Carter Scholz (né Robert Carter Scholz; born 1953) is an American speculative fiction author and composer of music. He lives in California.

Biography 
Scholz grew up in Tenafly, New Jersey and graduated from Tenafly High School in 1971. He also attended Rhode Island School of Design.

He has published several works of short fiction (collected in The Amount to Carry, 2003) and two novels (Palimpsests 1984, with Glenn Harcourt; Radiance: A Novel 2002). He has been nominated for the Hugo and Nebula Award for Best Novelette for his story "The Ninth Symphony of Ludwig van Beethoven and Other Lost Songs". He also co-wrote The New Twilight Zone episode "A Small Talent for War" and contributed stories to Kafka Americana.

References

External links

1953 births
Living people
Rhode Island School of Design alumni
Rhode Island School of Design alumni in music
American male novelists
People from Tenafly, New Jersey
American science fiction writers